Maryland Route 239 (MD 239) is a state highway in the U.S. state of Maryland. Known as Bushwood Wharf Road, the state highway runs  from a dead end at the Wicomico River east to MD 242 near Bushwood in western St. Mary's County. MD 239 was constructed in the late 1920s.

Route description

MD 239 begins at a dead end next to a boat ramp on Bushwood Cove of the Wicomico River at a spot historically known as Bushwood Wharf.  The state highway heads east as a  two-lane undivided road past the historic home Ocean Hall located to the south. At Bushwood Road, MD 239 curves to the southeast, passing through farmland and crossing Whites Neck Creek before intersecting the northern terminus of MD 520 (Whites Neck Road). MD 239 continues east to its own terminus at MD 242 (Colton Point Road).

History
MD 239 was constructed as a  gravel road starting in 1926. The state highway was built from MD 242 to Bushwood Road in 1927 and to the western terminus on the Wicomico River in 1928. MD 239 was widened and resurfaced with asphalt in 1956. The state highway has changed very little since then.

Junction list

See also

References

External links

MDRoads: MD 239

239
Maryland Route 239